Notylia sagittifera is a species of orchid that occurs from Colombia, Venezuela, the Guianas and northeastern Brazil.

References

External links 

sagittifera
Plants described in 1816
Orchids of South America